Povalikha is a rural locality (a selo) and the administrative center of Povalikhinsky Selsoviet, Pervomaysky District, Altai Krai, Russia. The population was 3,089 as of 2013. There are 37 streets.

Geography 
Povalikha is located 26 km northwest of Novoaltaysk (the district's administrative centre) by road. Kazachy is the nearest rural locality.

References 

Rural localities in Pervomaysky District, Altai Krai